This article details the complete oeuvre of American drummer Vincent Signorelli. He is recognized for his extensive discography performing as a member of many New York-based bands, including Swans, Of Cabbages and Kings, Unsane, Lubricated Goat and A Storm of Light. He has also recorded with Die Warzau and J. G. Thirlwell of Foetus.

Turbo Hy Dramatics

Studio albums

Extended plays

Swans

Studio albums

Live albums

Compilation albums

Unsane

Studio albums

Live albums

Compilation albums

Of Cabbages and Kings

Lubricated Goat

A Storm of Light

Credits

References

External links

Discographies of American artists
Rock music discographies